Margaret Lucas  is a Scottish mechanical engineer specializing in vibration analysis and the applications of high-power ultrasound, including shattering and sampling rock in space exploration, under-sea oil and gas exploration, and ultrasonic cutting devices in robot-assisted surgery. She is Professor of Ultrasonics and Head of Systems, Power & Energy Division in the James Watt School of Engineering at the University of Glasgow.

Education and career
Lucas was an undergraduate student at the University of Aberdeen, and earned a PhD in mechanical engineering at Loughborough University. She remained at Loughborough as a lecturer, beginning in 1990, and moved to the University of Glasgow in 1996. She became a professor there in 2006.

Recognition
Lucas was elected as a Fellow of the Royal Society of Edinburgh in 2020. Also in 2020, the Institution of Engineering and Technology gave Lucas the IET Achievement Medal for Ultrasonic Technology. In 2021 she was elected a Fellow of the Royal Academy of Engineering

References

Year of birth missing (living people)
Living people
Scottish mechanical engineers
Scottish women engineers
Alumni of the University of Aberdeen
Alumni of Loughborough University
Academics of Loughborough University
Academics of the University of Glasgow
Fellows of the Royal Society of Edinburgh
Fellows of the Royal Academy of Engineering
Female Fellows of the Royal Academy of Engineering